The National Democratic Congress (NDC), also known as the National Democratic Congress of Grenada, Carriacou and Petite Martinique, is a social democratic and centre-left political party in Grenada. It is the governing party in Grenada, having won a majority in the 2022 general elections. The party is led by current prime minister Dickon Mitchell as of October 2021.

History 
The party was founded in 1987 by George Brizan and Francis Alexis, as a party opposed to the New National Party government that came to power in the 1984 elections after the United States invasion of Grenada. It won the 1990 elections, with Nicholas Brathwaite becoming Prime Minister. It lost power to the NNP in the 1995 elections, which were held shortly after Brathwaite's resignation. The NDC was thereafter in opposition for 13 years. It failed to win any seats in the 1999 elections, but only narrowly lost the 2003 elections, in which it won 45.6% of the popular vote and seven of the 15 seats.

In the July 2008 general election, the NDC won 11 out of 15 seats, and party leader Tillman Thomas became Prime Minister. Despite a 40% vote share in the 2013 election, the party lost all its seats to the New National Party under Keith Mitchell, which obtained all 15 seats.

The party maintains close links with the other center-left political parties in the English-speaking Caribbean such as the Democratic Labour Party in Barbados.

List of leaders of the National Democratic Congress

Electoral history

House of Representatives elections

References

External links
Official website

Social democratic parties in North America
Political parties in Grenada
Political parties established in 1987
1987 establishments in Grenada
Main
Progressive Alliance
Republicanism in Grenada
Republican parties